1066 Lobelia, provisional designation , is a bright background asteroid from the inner regions of the asteroid belt, approximately 6 kilometers in diameter. It was discovered on 1 September 1926, by astronomer Karl Reinmuth at the Heidelberg-Königstuhl State Observatory in Germany. The asteroid was named after the flowering plant Lobelia (lobelias).

Orbit and classification 

Lobelia is a non-family asteroid from the main belt's background population. It orbits the Sun in the inner main-belt at a distance of 1.9–2.9 AU once every 3 years and 9 months (1,360 days; semi-major axis of 2.40 AU). Its orbit has an eccentricity of 0.21 and an inclination of 5° with respect to the ecliptic.

The body's observation arc begins at Simeiz Observatory in October 1926, one month after its official discovery observation at Heidelberg.

Physical characteristics 

The asteroid's spectral type is unknown.

Rotation period 

As of 2017, no rotational lightcurve of Lobelia was obtained from photometric observations. The body's rotation period, spin axis and shape remain unknown.

Diameter and albedo 

According to the survey carried out by the NEOWISE mission of NASA's Wide-field Infrared Survey Explorer, Lobelia measures 6.014 kilometers in diameter  and its surface has a high albedo of 0.488.

Naming 

This minor planet was named after the Indian tobacco flower, Lobelia, a genus of flowering plants also known as lobelias. The official naming citation was mentioned in The Names of the Minor Planets by Paul Herget in 1955.

Reinmuth's flowers 

Due to his many discoveries, Karl Reinmuth submitted a large list of 66 newly named asteroids in the early 1930s. This list also contained a sequence of 28 asteroids, starting with 1054 Forsytia, that were all named after plants, in particular flowering plants (also see list of minor planets named after animals and plants).

References

External links 
 Asteroid Lightcurve Database (LCDB), query form (info )
 Dictionary of Minor Planet Names, Google books
 Asteroids and comets rotation curves, CdR – Observatoire de Genève, Raoul Behrend
 Discovery Circumstances: Numbered Minor Planets (1)-(5000) – Minor Planet Center
 
 

001066
Discoveries by Karl Wilhelm Reinmuth
Named minor planets
19260901